Willington railway station served the town of Willington, County Durham, North East England from 1857 to 1964 on the Durham to Bishop Auckland Line.

History 
The station opened on 1 April 1857 by the North Eastern Railway. It was situated on the south side of Commercial Road. Along with Hunwick and Brancepeth, this was one of the first stations to open on the line. Nearby were the Willington and Sunnybrow Collieries. The station was closed to passengers on 4 May 1964, although it reopened for Miners Gala in July 1964. The station was closed to goods traffic on 10 August 1964.

References

External links 

Disused railway stations in County Durham
Former North Eastern Railway (UK) stations
Railway stations in Great Britain opened in 1857
Railway stations in Great Britain closed in 1964
Beeching closures in England
1857 establishments in England
1964 disestablishments in England
Willington, County Durham